Esther Muchemi, accountant, businesswoman, entrepreneur and corporate executive in Kenya, who serves as the group chief executive officer of the Samchi Group of Companies, a diverse Kenyan conglomerate, whose companies span telecommunications, microfinance, hospitality, real estate, restaurants and ICT.

Background
Muchemi was born in Kenya and attended local schools for her primary and secondary education. She graduated from the University of Nairobi with a Bachelor of Commerce degree. She then trained as an accountant and practiced as an auditor for twenty years, before striking out as an entrepreneur, on her own. She is also a Certified Public Accountant (CPA), with the Institute of Certified Public Accountants of Kenya.

Career
For a period of 16 years, dating back to 1984, she was employed in the accounting industry as an auditor. In 2000, she quit her regular employment and opened a retail shop on Koinange Street, in downtown Nairobi, Kenya's capital city, selling Safaricom sim-cards and airtime. Over the years she slowly expanded her empire into an investment group with nearly a dozen businesses.

Samchi Group
Muchemi organizes her businesses under the umbrella known as the Samchi Group of Companies'''. These first four are all in the telecommunications sector.

Other companies in the group are: (e) Samchi Credit Limited, a microfinance company (f) Samchi Heights Limited, a real estate development company (g) After 40 Hotel Limited, located along Biashara Street in Nairobi (h) El-Roi Plaza, a shopping arcade located along Tom Mboya Street in Nairobi (i) Heavenly Wings Limited, a restaurant within El-Roi Plaza and (j) a virtual office company called Space International Limited. In 2018, the Samchi Group employed a total of 560 individuals.

Other considerations
In 2017, Muchemi was the recipient of the 2017 Global Inspirational Women Leadership Award, awarded by the Centre for Economic and Leadership Development. She received the award at The 2017 South America–Africa–Middle East–Asia Women Summit, held in Dubai, United Arab Emirates. In the same year, she was inducted into Amazon’s 100 Global Women Leaders Hall of Fame''.

See also
 Stella Kilonzo
 Catherine Mturi-Wairi
 Nancy Onyango
 Esther Nyaiyaki

References

External links
Website of Samchi Telecommunication Limited

Living people
1960s births
Kikuyu people
People from Nairobi
University of Nairobi alumni
21st-century Kenyan businesswomen
21st-century Kenyan businesspeople
Kenyan business executives
Kenyan accountants